The 2011 Asian Judo Championships were held at UAE WJJ Federation Hall in Abu Dhabi, United Arab Emirates from 5 April to 7 April 2011.

Medal summary

Men

Women

Medal table

External links
 
 Men's Results
 Women's Results

Asian Championships
Asian Judo Championships
Asian Judo Championships
International sports competitions hosted by the United Arab Emirates
Sports competitions in Abu Dhabi
21st century in Abu Dhabi
Asian Championships 2011